Hibiscus stenanthus is a species of flowering plant in the family Malvaceae. It is found only in Yemen. Its natural habitat is rocky areas.

References

stenanthus
Endemic flora of Socotra
Least concern plants
Taxonomy articles created by Polbot
Taxa named by Isaac Bayley Balfour